The 1991–92 Michigan Wolverines men's basketball team represented the University of Michigan in intercollegiate college basketball during the 1991–92 season. The team played its home games in the Crisler Arena in Ann Arbor, Michigan, and was a member of the Big Ten Conference.  Under the direction of head coach Steve Fisher, the team finished tied for third in the Big Ten Conference.  The team earned an invitation to the 1992 NCAA Division I men's basketball tournament where it was national runner up.  Although the team compiled a 25–9 record during the season, the National Collegiate Athletic Association has adjusted the team's record to 24–8 due to the University of Michigan basketball scandal. The team was ranked for the entire eighteen weeks of Associated Press Top Twenty-Five Poll, starting the season ranked twentieth, rising as high as number eleven and ending ranked fifteenth, and it ended the season ranked seventeenth in the final USA Today/CNN Poll.  The team had a 6–6 record against ranked opponents, including the following victories: January 9, 1992, against the number sixteen ranked Iowa Hawkeyes 80–77 (overtime) at Carver–Hawkeye Arena in Iowa City, Iowa, January 29 against the number thirteen ranked Michigan State Spartans 89–79 (overtime) at the Breslin Student Events Center in East Lansing, Michigan, March 8 against the number two ranked Indiana Hoosiers 68–60 at Crisler Arena, March 27 the number eleven ranked  75–72 in the 1992 NCAA Division I men's basketball tournament at Rupp Arena, March 29 the number three ranked Ohio State Buckeyes 75–71 at Rupp Arena in Lexington, Kentucky, and April 4 against the number twelve ranked Cincinnati Bearcats 76–72 at the Hubert H. Humphrey Metrodome in Minneapolis.

The team had rotating captains on a game-by-game basis, and Chris Webber earned team MVP.  The team's leading scorers were Jalen Rose (597 points), Chris Webber (528 points), and Juwan Howard (377 points).  The leading rebounders were Webber (340), Howard (212), and Rose (146).

During the season, the team won the Big Ten Conference statistical championships in rebounding and rebounding margin with at 38.2 average and 5.8 average margin in conference games, respectively.  Chris Webber became the first freshman to lead the Big Ten in rebounds with a 9.8 average in 18 conference games and 10.0 average in 34 overall games.  However, his 340 rebounds in 34 games fell short of Phil Hubbard's school freshman single-season record of 352 rebounds set as a member of the 1975–76 team that still stands as the school record .

Jalen Rose set the current school record for points scored by a freshman 597. Rose also set the school single-season record for minutes played with 1132 minutes.  The following season, four players surpassed this total.

The team set the school record for single-season team blocks with 182 in 34 games, surpassing the 1986 teams total of 146 in 33 games.  The following season the team would rebreak the record.

The Wolverines 25–9 record was an improvement on the previous year's record of 14–15. Due to the success of the Fab Five, athletic royalties increased from 2 million dollars in 1990 ($ million today) to 4.4 million dollars ($ million) in 1992.

The team, coached  by Steve Fisher, is best remembered for the entry of a remarkably talented freshman class, known as the Fab Five, that would become the starting lineup:
 Center: Juwan Howard
 Power forward: Chris Webber
 Small forward: Ray Jackson
 Shooting guard: Jimmy King
 Point guard: Jalen Rose

Reserve point guard Rob Pelinka would go on to greater fame as an agent for numerous NBA stars, most notably Kobe Bryant.

Although the Wolverines would make the NCAA title game that season, losing to defending national champion Duke, they vacated their Final Four appearance in the wake of a major scandal involving many years of improper payments from a major booster to several former players, among them Webber.

Schedule

|-
!colspan=9 style=| Non-conference regular season

|-
!colspan=9 style=| Big Ten Conference regular season

|-
!colspan=9 style=| NCAA tournament

Regular season
As Michigan celebrated Midnight Madness on October 15, 1991, there was already talk that at least four of the five freshmen would be starting before the season ended. (The five eventually started in a combined 304 of a possible 350 man-games among them during their first two seasons.) In the Elite Eight round of the 1992 NCAA Men's Division I basketball tournament, Michigan earned a rematch against a Jimmy Jackson-led Ohio State Buckeyes team that had beaten them twice during the regular season by double digits.  Michigan won the rematch, during which the Fab Five scored all but two Wolverines points.  When the 24–8 Wolverines reached the Final Four round of the tournament, they found themselves matched against a 29–4 Bob Huggins-coached Cincinnati Bearcats team that averaged 83.6 points per game and had lost to only three teams, two of which had beaten Michigan.  Nick Van Exel, who became the starter in the middle of the season, led Cincinnati in postseason scoring.  Howard, King and Riley shaved their heads for the game.  Michigan won and earned a rematch with the Duke Blue Devils team that had beaten them by three points in overtime in December.  Duke scored in its final 12 possessions of the championship game, going on a 23–6 run to win by a final margin of 71–51.

Statistics
The team posted the following statistics:

 * Denotes players whose individual records, awards and other honors have been vacated due to NCAA and U-M sanctions

Rankings

NCAA tournament
On March 20 as the number six seed in the first round of the southeast region of the 1992 NCAA Division I men's basketball tournament in Atlanta at the Omni Coliseum, the team defeated number eleven seed Temple 73–66. On March 22, the team defeated number fourteen seed East Tennessee State 102–90 in Atlanta.  Then in the sweet sixteen, in Lexington, Kentucky, at Rupp Arena on March 27, the team defeated number two seeded  75–72.  On March 29 in the elite eight round in Lexington, the team defeated number one seed Ohio State 75–71 in overtime. In the national semifinal round of the final four on April 4 in Minneapolis at the Hubert H. Humphrey Metrodome, the team defeated number four seed Cincinnati 76–72.  However, in the championship game at the Metrodome on April 6, the team lost to number one seed Duke 51–71.

The team established the NCAA record for fewest single-game three-point field goals made in a final four (1 vs. Duke on April 6, 1992), a record the team would surpass the following year.  It also established the record for lowest single-game three-point field goal percentage with a 1-for-11 performance (9.1%) that stood until 2006. Although these final four records have been surpassed, both of these marks continue to stand as NCAA records for the championship game.

Awards and honors

Team players drafted into the NBA
Five players from this team were selected in the NBA draft.

See also
List of vacated and forfeited games in college basketball
University of Michigan basketball scandal

References

External links
Michigan Wolverines men's basketball official website 

Michigan Wolverines men's basketball seasons
Michigan
NCAA Division I men's basketball tournament Final Four seasons
Michigan
Michigan
Michigan